Songs from the South: 1985–2019 is a career-spanning greatest hits album by Australian singer-songwriter Paul Kelly. It was released on 15 November 2019 through Gawd Aggie and EMI Music Australia, and debuted atop the Australian albums chart.

Background and release
In 1997, Paul Kelly released his first compilation Songs from the South. A second volume, Songs from the South Volume 2 was released in 2008. Eleven years later, the collection is getting a third upgrade. The 2019 album includes the brand new song "When We're Both Old & Mad" with Kasey Chambers.

Track listing

Charts

Weekly charts

Year-end charts

See also

 List of number-one albums of 2019 (Australia)

References

2019 greatest hits albums
Compilation albums by Australian artists
Paul Kelly (Australian musician) albums